Sha Chau (formerly transliterated as Saw-Chow) is an island in the northwest waters of Hong Kong. It is off the shore of Lung Kwu Tan near Tuen Mun in the mainland New Territories, separated by the Urmston Road waterway.

Geography
Sha Chau is composed of four islets including Sheung Sha Chau, Tai Sha Chau, Ha Sha Chau and Siu Sha Chau.

History
Sha Chau was a shelter for British merchant ships carrying opium during the Qing era.

Features
A Tin Hau Temple is located on Siu Sha Chau. According to inscriptions, the temple was initially built in 1846 by fishermen from Castle Peak Bay off Sha Chau. The temple was destroyed by a fire in the 1970s and was rebuilt in 1998. It was a Grade II Historic Building from 1981 to 2010, when its listing was revised to "no grade".

An aviation fuel receipt facility (the Receipt Jetty) is located at Sheung Sha Chau. The Receipt Jetty is where bulk intake of fuel for Hong Kong airport takes place. The Receipt Jetty is connected to twin  submarine pipelines which carry the fuel to Chek Lap Kok. Sha Chau was initially intended to be a temporary location for the facility.

Tai Sha Chau is the site of an approach surveillance radar (ASR) and of a Secondary Surveillance Radar (SSR) for air traffic control.

Conservation
Since 1996, the island, together with Lung Kwu Chau and Pak Chau fall within the boundaries of the Sha Chau and Lung Kwu Chau Marine Park. The three island have been listed as a Site of Special Scientific Interest since 1979. It is known as a dolphin sanctuary where is the habitat for the Chinese white dolphin.

See also

List of islands and peninsulas of Hong Kong
Outlying Islands

References

External links

Antiquities Advisory Board. Historic Building Appraisal. Tin Hau Temple, Sha Chau Pictures
Pictures of Sha Chau:   
Environment study from WWF HK 
Aerial image from Google Map
Aerial video

Uninhabited islands of Hong Kong
Tuen Mun District
Islands of Hong Kong